Somber Eyes to the Sky is the debut studio album by American heavy metal band Shadows Fall, released in 1997 on Matt Bachand's own label Lifeless Records in the United States, while the European release was handled by Genet Records. This was the band's last release and only studio album with lead singer Philip Labonte, who helped form All That Remains the following year.

Background
Most of the album's songs had previously appeared on demo albums released by the band.

The songs "Lifeless", "Suffer the Season" and "Fleshold" originally appeared on the band's demo, Mourning a Dead World, released in 1996. The songs "Eternal" and "Somber Angel" were originally recorded and released on a demo EP in 1997. "To Ashes" originally appeared on the  7-inch EP of the same name, which was also released in 1997; the EP also contained a re-recording of "Fleshold".

Audio mastering was done at Monkeyhouse Studios in Northampton, Massachusetts.

Music and lyrics
Somber Eyes to the Sky is different from the usual metalcore sound of the band's subsequent albums, featuring a  melodic death metal sound with elements of standard death metal. Phil Labonte's vocals are generally death growl vocals that resemble Glen Benton of death metal band Deicide. Melodic guitar riffs and occasional dissonant riffs are featured throughout the album. The lyrics are dreary, with themes like despair, depression, suicide, isolation and loneliness being featured throughout the album.

Background, recording and release

In 1996, Shadows Fall recorded a demo called Mourning a Dead World, printing 200 copies. Guitarist Matt Bachand said the demo "was really intended just for us to work on things". People bought the demo and Shadows Fall began to have concerts. Bachand formed Lifeless Records to produce Somber Eyes to the Sky and both self-financed and self-promoted it. Genet Records of Belgium created a repress of the album, and Somber Eyes to the Sky sold 15,000 copies worldwide, including a few thousand in Europe. Somber Eyes to the Sky was recorded in Zing Recording Studios in Westfield, Massachusetts. Released on November 30, 1997, Somber Eyes to the Sky had success in late 1998 and early 1999 on CMJ New Music Report Loud Rock airplay chart, reaching the top ten and remaining on the chart for several weeks.

Touring and promotion

Shadows Fall toured in 1998 and opened for Six Feet Under, Overcast and Shai Hulud. Other shows the band had included the Cleveland "World Series of Metal" event, Milwaukee Metalfest, and one show on the Van Warped package tour. In the fall of 1998, Phil Labonte left Shadows Fall and was replaced by Brain Fair. In a later interview in 2007, Labonte explained why he left Shadows Fall:

Fair replaced Labonte after Fair's previous band Overcast disbanded. Shadows Fall then performed again at the Milwaukee Metalfest and the New Jersey March Metal Meltdown. This caught the attention of Century Media Records, and the record label signed Shadows Fall in late 1999. A headline show earned Shadows Fall the top billing for the New England "Metal & Hardcore" festival in 2000.

Track listing

Personnel
Adapted from the album's liner notes.

Shadows Fall
Shadows Fall  – audio mixing, & music
 Philip Labonte – lead vocals; lyrics
 Jon Donais – lead guitar, backing vocals; co-lyrics (6), & (8)
 Matt Bachand – rhythm guitar, clean vocals
 Paul Romanko – bass
 David Germain – drums

Additional credits

Additional musicians
 Carrie Beth Nickerson  – violin 
 Jim Fogarty  – additional sounds

Artwork
Scott Lee  – band photography
Tobias Dutkiewicz – artwork

Additional mixing
Adam Dutkiewicz
Jim Fogarty

Additional lyricist
Damien McPherson – (6), (8), & (10)

Citations

Bibliography

Shadows Fall albums
1997 debut albums
Albums produced by Adam Dutkiewicz